Tadeusz Szelachowski (7 April 1932 – 9 September 2020) was a Polish politician who served as Minister of Health and Social Security.

References

1930s births
2020 deaths
Polish politicians